Mouchet is a surname of French origin. Notable people with the surname include:

Catherine Mouchet (born 1959), French actress
Louis Mouchet (born 1957), Swiss filmmaker

See also
Maquis du Mont Mouchet, a French resistance group during World War II
Mont Mouchet, a mountain on the border of the French departments of Cantal, Haute-Loire, and Lozère
Mouchel (surname)